Filipescu is a surname common in Romania, meaning "son of Philip" and may refer to:

the Filipescu family of Wallachian boyars (also known as Filipide), having among its members Mitică Filipescu (radical revolutionary), Alecu Filipescu-Vulpea (minister), Ioan Filipescu (caimacam of Wallachia), Nicolae Filipescu and Grigore Filipescu (conservative politicians)
Elena Filipescu (or Filipovici), communist militant
Iulian Filipescu, Romanian football player
Leonte Filipescu, communist militant
Miltidate Filipescu, geologist
Radu Filipescu, Romanian anti-Communist dissident and inventor
Zaharia Filipescu, actor

Romanian-language surnames
Patronymic surnames
Surnames from given names